Denis Nekrasov (born 19 February 1997) is a Russian cyclist, who currently rides for UCI ProTeam .

Major results
2015
 3rd Scratch, Junior World Track Championships
 3rd Points race, Junior European Track Championships
2017
 1st  National Madison Championships (with Maksim Piskunov)
2021 
 7th Classic Grand Besançon Doubs

References

External links

1997 births
Living people
Russian male cyclists